Marinobacter is a genus of bacteria found in sea water. They are also found in a variety of salt lakes.
A number of strains and species can degrade hydrocarbons. The species involved in hydrocarbon degradation include M. alkaliphilus, M. arcticus, M. hydrocarbonoclasticus, M. maritimus & M. squalenivorans.

There are currently 46 species of Marinobacter that are characterized by Gram-negative rods and salt-tolerance.

References 

Alteromonadales
Hydrocarbon-degrading bacteria
Bacteria genera